Hasan Khan Baghi (also Romanized as Ḩasan Khān Bāghī; also known as Ḩasan Khānī Bāghī) is a village in Garmeh-ye Jonubi Rural District, in the Central District of Meyaneh County, East Azerbaijan Province, Iran. At the 2006 census, its population was 42, in 7 families.

References 

Populated places in Meyaneh County